Huércal-Overa is a town and a municipality of Almería province, in the autonomous community of Andalusia, Spain, located near the border with the province of Murcia. The population of Huércal-Overa in 2018 was 18, 816.  Huércal-Overa is situated in the Valley of Almanzora and its main economic sources have to do with agricultural activities.  It is the main town of Levante Almeriense shire. It celebrates its yearly fair on the 3rd weekend of October.

Demographics

High schools
Nowadays, this town has two secondary schools: IES Cura Valera  and IES Albujaira

References

External links
  Huércal-Overa - Sistema de Información Multiterritorial de Andalucía
  Huércal-Overa - Diputación Provincial de Almería
   Villa de Huércal-Overa - Visita toda su gastronomía, fotos, foros deportes

Municipalities in the Province of Almería